As She Pleases is the debut extended play by American singer and songwriter Madison Beer, released on February 2, 2018. The EP was supported by three singles; "Dead", "Say It to My Face" and "Home with You". It debuted at number 93 on the Billboard 200, and reached the top 10 of the US Independent Albums charts. The EP spawned the single “Home with You”.

Singles
The EP's lead single, "Dead", was released along with its lyric video on May 19, 2017. The music video premiered on Beer's Vevo account on August 3, 2017. Remixes from Cedric Gervais and Laibert, as well as an acoustic version, were released to promote the track.

The second single, "Say It to My Face", was released on November 3, 2017. Twelve days later, on November 15, the music video premiered via Beer's Vevo account. Remixes from the song by The Wideboys were released on December 15, 2017.

"Home with You" was made the third single on February 2, 2018. The music video was released on June 14, 2018.

Tour
On January 28, 2018, Beer announced via Instagram she would be headlining her first tour, the "As She Pleases Tour". Late in the day, she revealed that the first leg would be in Europe.  On February 5, 2018, she announced the second leg of her tour via Twitter, in North America.

Shows

Track listing

Charts

References

EPs by American artists
2018 debut EPs
Contemporary R&B EPs
Madison Beer albums